

Events 

 January–June 
 War of the Three Henrys: In France, the Catholic League is in rebellion against King Henry III, in revenge for his murder of Henry I, Duke of Guise in December 1588. The King makes peace with his old rival, the Huguenot Henry of Navarre, his designated successor, and together they besiege Paris.
 January 26 – Job is elected as the first Patriarch of Moscow and All Russia.
 February 26 – Valkendorfs Kollegium is founded in Copenhagen, Denmark.
 April 13 – An English Armada, led by Sir Francis Drake and Sir John Norreys, and largely financed by private investors, sets sail to attack the Iberian Peninsula's Atlantic coast, but fails to achieve any naval advantage.

 July–December 
 August 1 – King Henry III of France is stabbed by the fanatical Dominican friar Jacques Clément (who is immediately killed).
 August 2 – Following the death of Henry III of France, his army is thrown into confusion and an attempt to retake Paris is abandoned. Henry of Navarre succeeds to the throne as King Henry IV of France, but is not recognized by the Catholic League, who acclaim the imprisoned Charles, Cardinal de Bourbon, as the rightful King of France, Charles X.
 August 20 – King James VI of Scotland, the future James I of England, contracts a proxy marriage with the 14-year-old Anne of Denmark at Kronborg. The formal ceremony takes place on November 23 at the Old Bishop's Palace in Oslo.
 September 21 – Battle of Arques: King Henry IV of France's forces defeat those of the Catholic League, under Charles of Lorraine, Duke of Mayenne (younger brother of Henry I, Duke of Guise).
 November 1 – Henry IV of France is repulsed in an attempt to capture Paris from the Catholic League.
 December 25 (Christmas Day) – The monks of the Pechenga Monastery, the northernmost in the world, are massacred by Swedes, led by a Finnish peasant chief, in the course of the Russo-Swedish War.

 Date unknown 
 San Luigi dei Francesi, Rome, is completed by Domenico Fontana.
 Hiroshima is founded, by the Japanese warlord Mōri Terumoto.
 The Hofbräuhaus is founded, by William V, Duke of Bavaria, in Munich.

Births

January–June
 January 8 – Ivan Gundulić, Croatian poet (d. 1638)
 January 11 – William Strode, English politician (d. 1666)
 January 28 – Francisco Ximénez de Urrea, Spanish historian (d. 1647)
 February 5
 Honorat de Bueil, seigneur de Racan (d. 1670)
 Esteban Manuel de Villegas, Spanish poet (d. 1669)
 February 7 – Jacob de Witt, Mayor of Dordrecht (d. 1674)
 February 8 – Peter Melander Graf von Holzappel, Protestant military leader in the Thirty Years' War (d. 1648)
 February 18
 Henry Vane the Elder, English politician (d. 1655)
 Maarten Gerritsz Vries, Dutch explorer (d. 1646)
 March 1 – Thomas Middleton, English politician (d. 1662)
 March 3 – Gisbertus Voetius, Dutch theologian (d. 1676)
 March 18 – Richard Sackville, 3rd Earl of Dorset, English noble (d. 1624)
 April 16 – Nicolaes le Febure, Dutch Golden Age member of the Haarlem schutterij (d. 1641)
 April 17 – Martin Zeiler, German author (d. 1661)
 April 18 – John, Duke of Östergötland, Swedish prince (d. 1618)
 April 20 – John Casimir, Count Palatine of Kleeburg, son of John I (d. 1652)
 April 28 – Margaret of Savoy, Vicereine of Portugal (d. 1655)
 May 12 – François L’Anglois, French artist (d. 1647)
 May 28 – Robert Arnauld d'Andilly, French writer (d. 1674)
 June 9 – John of St. Thomas, Portuguese philosopher (d. 1644)
 June 16 – Albrycht Władysław Radziwiłł, Polish prince (d. 1636)
 June 20 – Giambattista Altieri, Italian Catholic cardinal (d. 1654)

July–December
 July 2 – Richard Pepys, English politician (d. 1659)
 July 3 – Johann Georg Wirsung, German anatomist (d. 1643)
 July 15 – Cornelis Bol, Flemish painter and etcher (d. 1666)
 July 16 – Sinibaldo Scorza, Italian painter (d. 1631)
 August 1 – Alexandrine von Taxis, German Imperial General Post Master (d. 1666) 
 August 8 – Framlingham Gawdy, English politician (d. 1654)
 August 12
 Domenico Fiasella, Italian painter (d. 1669)
 Ulrich, Duke of Pomerania, Bishop of Cammin (d. 1622)
 August 15 – Gabriel Báthory, Prince of Transylvania (d. 1613)
 September 1 – Giovanni Pesaro, Doge of Venice (d. 1659)
 September 7 – August of Saxony, German prince (d. 1615)
 September 17 – Agostinho Barbosa, Portuguese bishop in Italy and writer on canon law (d. 1649)
 October 7 – Maria Magdalena of Austria (d. 1631)
 October 8 – Pedro de Villagómez Vivanco, Roman Catholic prelate, Archbishop of Lima, then Bishop of Arequipa (d. 1671)
 October 24 – Giuseppe Marcinò, Italian priest, member of the Order of Friars Minor - or Capuchins (d. 1655)
 October 25 – Jan Stanisław Sapieha, Grand Hetman of Lithuania (d. 1635)
 October 31 – Muhammad Parviz, Mughal emperor (d. 1626)
 December 21 – Otto, Count of Lippe-Brake (1621–1657) (d. 1657)

Date unknown
 Tsar Feodor II of Russia (d. 1605)
 Yönten Gyatso, 4th Dalai Lama
 John Bankes, Attorney General and Chief Justice to King Charles I of England (d. 1644)
 Jusepa Vaca, Spanish stage actress (d. 1653)

Deaths 

 January 5 – Catherine de' Medici, queen of Henry II of France (b. 1519)
 January 18 – Magnus Heinason, Faroese naval hero (b. 1545)
 February 19 – Philothei, Greek Orthodox religious sister, martyr and saint (b. 1522)
 March 2 – Alessandro Farnese, Italian cardinal (b. 1530)
 March 3 – Johannes Sturm, German educator (b. 1507)
 March 22 – Lodovico Guicciardini, Italian historian (b. 1521)
 March 23 – Marcin Kromer, Prince-Bishop of Warmia (b. 1512)
 April 26 – Benedict the Moor, Italian Franciscan friar and saint (b. 1526)
 May 3 – Julius, Duke of Brunswick-Lüneburg (b. 1528)
 May 17 – Charles II, Lord of Monaco (b. 1555)
 May 20 – Anna Maria of Brandenburg-Ansbach, German princess (b. 1526)
 July 1 – Lady Saigō, Japanese concubine (b. 1552)
 July 16 – Petrus Peckius the Elder, Dutch jurist, writer on international maritime law (b. 1529)
 July 29 – Maria of the Palatinate-Simmern, Duchess consort of Södermanland (1579-1589) (b. 1561)
 August 1 – Jacques Clément, French assassin of Henry III of France (b. 1567)
 August 2 – King Henry III of France (b. 1551)
 September 16 – Michael Baius, Flemish theologian (b. 1513)
 September 19 – Jean-Antoine de Baïf, French poet (b. 1532)
 October 1 – William Darrell of Littlecote, English politician (b. 1539)
 October 15 – Jacopo Zabarella, Italian philosopher (b. 1532)
 November 15 – Philipp Apian, German mathematician and medic (b. 1531)
 December 10 – Henry Compton, 1st Baron Compton, English politician (b. 1544)
 December 12 – Francisco Balbi di Correggio, Italian soldier in the service of Spain during the Siege of Malta (b. 1505)

Date unknown 
 Pietro de' Mariscalchi, Italian painter (b. 1520)
 Tansen, Indian musician (b. 1506)
 Heo Nanseolheon, Korean poet (b. 1563)
 Charles Dançay, French diplomat (b. 1510)

References